Lalchand Amardinomal Jagtiani (25 January 1885 - 18 April 1954) was a story writer, novelist and essayist from Hyderabad, Sindh, British India (Now Pakistan). He authored 62 books including one-act plays, short stories, criticism and scholarly articles.

Early life 
Lalchand was born on 25 January 1885 in Hyderabad, Sindh, British India (now Pakistan). His father, Deewan Amerdino, was a Mukhtiarkar in the Revenue Department of Sindh. He received primary education privately at his home. After passing the matriculation examination from Hiranand Academy (now Government Naval Rai Hiranand High School Society No. 1) Hyderabad in 1903, he was appointed as a school teacher at Sindh Madersatul Islam High School Karachi (now Sindh Madarsatul Islam University). He also served as a school teacher and then as a headmaster at New High School Karachi. During his job as a school teacher, he continued his education and earned a Bachelor of Arts degree in 1918.

Literary Contributions 
Lalchand Amardinomal Jagtiani was interested in reading and literature since childhood. He was 20 years old when his first novel "Choth jo Chand" (Sindhi: چوٿ جو چنڊ) was published.

Lalchand Amardinomal is regarded as one of the modern writers of Sindhi literature. He was the first to introduce rhythmic prose and travelogue in Sindhi literature. He was a legendary personification of Sindhi literature. He authored novels, short stories, essays and research articles. He was highly inspired by classical poets like Shah Abdul Latif Bhittai, Sachal Sarmast, Saami, Ruhal Faquir, Khalifo Gul Muhammad Gul and others. He wrote more than 62 books.

In 1914, he established the Sindhi Sahetia Society, a milestone in the development of Sindhi literature, under whose aegis literary books were published every month for a period of 15 years. He served as Joint Secretary of the Central Advisory Board for Sindhi Literature in 1940. He also served as the founding managing editor of "Mehran" - the quarterly literary magazine of Sindhi Adabi Board.

Dramatic Societies 
Lalchand Amardinomal founded the dramatic society Banday Matarm Natak Mandly in 1905. He wrote a number of plays for the society including Bharat Java - Uth Uthy Jag and  Amaldar keen Raiyat Azar. In 1923, Rabindranath Tagore Literary and Dramatic Club Hyderabad and Karachi was founded. Rabindranath Tagore himself inaugurated this club at the invitation of Khanchand Daryani and Lalchand Amardinomal. Renowned writers Jethmal Prasram, Deyaldas Lalwani and Mangharam Malkani were also part of the club.

Books 
Lalchand Amardinomal Jagtiani authored more than 62 books. Niaz Masroor Badvi has compiled a list of his 62 books. The following table contains a list of his 21 famous books.

Death 
After the partition of India, Lalchand Amardinomal reluctantly left Sindh and migrated to India in 1948. He wrote a will that his ashes be flown to the Sindhu (Indus) river. He died on 18 April 1954. As per his will his ashes were flown to the Indus river, near Gidu Bander (Hussainabad), Hyderabad, Sindh on 18 April 1956.

References 

1885 births
1956 deaths
People from Hyderabad, Sindh
Scholars from Sindh
Sindhi-language writers
Sindhi people